was a Japanese freestyle swimmer. He won gold medals in the 4 × 200 m relay in the 1932 and 1936 Olympics, setting world records on both occasions. In 1936 he finished almost simultaneously with Shigeo Arai and Masaharu Taguchi in the 100 m race and was awarded a silver medal.

Yusa graduated from Nihon University and later worked for the Yokohama Rubber Company. In 1942, he married Yumeko Aizome, a famous stage and silent/sound film actress in Japan.

See also
 List of members of the International Swimming Hall of Fame

References

1915 births
1975 deaths
Olympic swimmers of Japan
Olympic gold medalists for Japan
Olympic silver medalists for Japan
Swimmers at the 1932 Summer Olympics
Swimmers at the 1936 Summer Olympics
World record setters in swimming
Japanese male freestyle swimmers
Nihon University alumni
Medalists at the 1936 Summer Olympics
Medalists at the 1932 Summer Olympics
Olympic gold medalists in swimming
Olympic silver medalists in swimming
20th-century Japanese people